Utkino is a rural locality (a settlement) in Staroselskoye Rural Settlement, Vologodsky District, Vologda Oblast, Russia. The population was 720 as of 2002. There are 4 streets.

Geography 
Utkino is located 32 km southwest of Vologda (the district's administrative centre) by road. Dor is the nearest rural locality.

References 

Rural localities in Vologodsky District